Andriy Fedechko (born 4 December 1990) is a Ukrainian modern pentathlete. He competed at the 2016 Summer Olympics in Rio de Janeiro, in the men's event.

References

1990 births
Living people
Ukrainian male modern pentathletes
Olympic modern pentathletes of Ukraine
Modern pentathletes at the 2016 Summer Olympics
World Modern Pentathlon Championships medalists
21st-century Ukrainian people